Francisco Sánchez Ruíz (born December 29, 1991 in Murcia, Spain) is a Spanish professional pool player and the reigning World champion in both eight-ball and nine-ball.

Career
Sánchez won the World Nine-ball Junior Championship in 2010, defeating  Jesse Engel 11–6 in the final. 

In 2016, Sánchez won the 2016 European Pool Championship in nine-ball defeating Joshua Filler in the final, 9–3. He also reached the final of the eight-ball event, but lost 7–8 to Vitaly Pazura.

Sánchez was the runner-up at the 2017 Austrian Open, defeated in the final 9-2 by Mario He.

In 2022 Sánchez won the U.S. Open 9-Ball Championship defeating Max Lechner in the final 13-10. He then won his first world title at the WPA World Eight-ball Championship over Wiktor Zieliński in the same year.

Sánchez won his second world title at the World Nine-ball Championship in 2023.

Titles and achievements
 2023 Premier League Pool 
 2023 WPA World Nine-ball Championship 
 2022 Billiards Digest Player of the Year 
 2022 Mosconi Cup
 2022 Euro Tour Petrich Open 
 2022 WPA World Eight-ball Championship
 2022 U.S. Open 9-Ball Championship 
 2022 PRP Nine-Ball Open 
 2022 World Cup of Pool - with (David Alcaide)
 2022 Derby City Classic 9-Ball 
 2021 Euro Tour Lasko Open 
 2021 Euro Tour Antalya Open  
 2019 Spanish Amateur Snooker Championship 
 2018 Spanish Amateur Snooker Championship 
 2017 World Pool Series Cheqio Challenge 
 2016 European Pool Championship 9-Ball 
 2015 Spanish Pool Championship 10-Ball 
 2015 Spanish Pool Championship 9-Ball 
 2015 Spanish Pool Championship 8-ball 
 2014 Spanish Pool Championship 9-Ball 
 2014 Spanish Pool Championship 8-ball
 2013 Spanish Pool Championship 9-Ball 
 2012 Spanish Pool Championship 8-ball 
 2010 WPA World Nine-ball Junior Championship 
 2008 Spanish Pool Championship 8-ball 
 2007 Spanish Pool Championship 9-Ball

References

External links

Spanish pool players
Living people
Sportspeople from Murcia
1991 births